Karolis Navickas (born 9 April 1990 in Šiauliai, Lithuania) is a Lithuanian rugby union player currently playing for US Bressane in French Rugby Pro D2.

Early career
Navickas, known as "Bebras" (Beaver) in his home country, has already been in many clubs around the world. Since leaving his native Lithuania where he was part of the Lithuanian championship winning side RC Vairas, has also played in Russia with VVA, having previously taken part of the South African  Under 21s side, where he stayed for a season before his European return. After his spell in Russia, he played for the Sale Sharks reserve XV.

In March 2012 he signed a 2-year contract with French Top 14 side Union Bordeaux Bègles. At the end of the 2012-2013 season he joined the Russian team of Krasny Yar.

Besides rugby, Navickas also practiced amateur boxing.

External links
 http://rugbyrugby.com/news/more_news/southern_hemisphere/7002637/kitshoff_packs_for_bordeaux
 http://www.sudouest.fr/2012/03/08/union-bordeaux-begles-saubusse-et-brousse-prolongent-un-lituanien-arrive-653636-4564.php

1990 births
Living people
Lithuanian rugby union players
Rugby union locks
Lithuanian expatriate rugby union players
Expatriate rugby union players in England
Expatriate rugby union players in France
Expatriate rugby union players in Russia
Lithuanian expatriate sportspeople in France
Lithuanian expatriate sportspeople in Russia
Lithuanian expatriate sportspeople in England